Altered nuclear transfer is an alternative method of obtaining embryonic-like, pluripotent stem cells without the creation and destruction of human embryos. The process was originally proposed by William B. Hurlbut.

External links
Explanation of the theory of Altered Nuclear Transfer
Stem cell harvesting techniques

Biological techniques and tools
Stem cells
Induced stem cells